Rodney Gregory Lake (born September 16, 1979), known as Gregory, is a Aruban former footballer who plays as a Midfielder/Right Midfielder for Aruban Division di Honor club Dakota and a former member of the Aruba national football team and currently who serves as assistant Manager of football club Dakota.

Honours
Britannia
Aruban Division di Honor: 2008–09, 2009–10, 2013–14,
 Finalist: 2012–13
Torneo Copa Betico Croes: 2007–08, 2008–09, 2009–10, 2010–11
 Finalist: 2015–16

Real Piedra Plat
Aruban Division Uno: 2016–17

Manager
Dakota
Aruban Division di Honor: 2021–22

National team statistics

References

1979 births
Living people
Aruban footballers
Association football midfielders
SV Britannia players
SV Dakota players
Aruba international footballers